There are 7 lakes named Summit Lake in the U.S. state of Oregon:

See also 
 List of lakes in Oregon

Lakes of Oregon